Herbert Pakington may refer to:
 Sir Herbert Pakington, 5th Baronet, English politician
 Herbert Stuart Pakington, 4th Baron Hampton, chief commissioner of the Scout Association